The 1963–64 season was the 49th in the history of the Isthmian League, an English football competition.

The league was expanded up to twenty clubs after the Athenian League sides Enfield, Hendon, Hitchin Town and Sutton United were admitted.

Wimbledon were champions for the third season in a row, winning their eighth Isthmian League title. At the end of the season Wimbledon switched to the Southern Football League.

League table

References

Isthmian League seasons
I